In Slovakia about  1300 mineral sources providing curative water and high quality mineral water for drinking are registered. There are 21 thermal spa towns built on these mineral springs. The most visited are Piešťany, Trenčianske Teplicie, Bardejov and Dudince.

List of spa towns:

 
 Bojnice
 Brusno
 Číž
 Dudince
 
 Liptovský Ján
 Lúčky
 Piešťany
 Rajecké Teplice
 
 Nimnica
 Smrdáky
 Sklené Teplice
 Vyšné Ružbachy
 Trenčianske Teplice
 Turčianske Teplice

In addition to thermal spas there are also several climatic spas (Štrbské Pleso, Nový Smokovec, Štós, Tatranské Matliare, High Tatras).